Shoqata Çameria is a national political organisation supporting the rights of the Cham people and advocacy of the Cham issue. It is one of the main NGOs in Albania. It was created on 22 January 1991, which makes it one of the first NGOs registered since the pluralism.

References

Cham Albanians
Think tanks based in Albania
1991 establishments in Albania
Think tanks established in 1991
Albania–Greece relations
Chameria